Japonichilo is a monotypic moth genus of the family Crambidae described by Masao Okano in 1962. It contains only one species, Japonichilo bleszynskii, described in the same article, which is found in Japan (Honshu), China (Sichuan, Kiangsu, Manchuria) and the Russian Far East (Ussuri).

References

Crambinae
Crambidae genera
Monotypic moth genera